Tuggeranong is one of the original eighteen districts of the Australian Capital Territory used in land administration. The district is subdivided into divisions (suburbs), sections and blocks and is the southernmost town centre of Canberra, the capital city of Australia. The district comprises nineteen suburbs and occupies  to the east of the Murrumbidgee River.

The name Tuggeranong is derived from a Ngunnawal expression meaning "cold place". From the earliest colonial times, the plain extending south into the centre of the present-day territory was referred to as Tuggeranong.

Establishment and governance
Following the transfer of land from the Government of New South Wales to the Commonwealth Government in 1911, the district was established in 1966 by the Commonwealth via the gazettal of the Districts Ordinance 1966 (Cth) which, after the enactment of the Australian Capital Territory (Self-Government) Act 1988, became the Districts Act 1966. This Act was subsequently repealed by the ACT Government and the district is now administered subject to the Districts Act 2002.

History
Cave paintings and Aboriginal artifacts discovered in the area confirm that the Tuggeranong region has been occupied by the original inhabitants, the Ngunnawal people, for over  years. The area lies close to the recognised traditional lands of the Ngarigo-speaking people. 

The first Europeans arrived in the Canberra region in 1820 and a year later, a third expedition led by Charles Throsby reached the Murrumbidgee River near the present-day Pine Island and the valley now occupied by the Tuggeranong district. In 1823 Joseph Wild was employed by Brigade Major John Ovens and Captain Mark Currie to guide them to the Murrumbidgee. They travelled south along the river and named the area now known as Tuggeranong Isabella's Plain in honour of Governor Brisbane's infant daughter. Unable to cross the river near the current site of Tharwa, they continued on to the Monaro Plains.

The last expedition in the region was undertaken by Allan Cunningham in 1824. Cunningham's reports verified that the region was suitable for grazing, and the settlement of the Limestone Plains followed immediately thereafter.

In 1828, the bushranger John Tennant, known as the 'Terror of Argyle', was captured by James Ainslie and a party of others near the Murrumbidgee River in Tuggeranong. Tennant had been a convict assigned to Joshua John Moore at Canberry, a property in the present day inner north Canberra. Mount Tennent, behind Tharwa, is named after the bushranger (note the difference in spelling).

The first authorised settler was James Murdoch.  In 1824 he was offered a land grant on a small plain known by the local Aboriginal people as 'Togranong' meaning 'cold plains'.  He took up the grant in 1827.  Lanyon station was established in 1835 and originally owned by James Wright, his brother William and John Lanyon.  Wright bought the property from Lanyon, who had only remained in Australia for three years. In 1838, Wright commenced the building of the homestead, which he named after his partner, Lanyon. The homestead was built with the strength of a fort to withstand the attacks of bushrangers. Wright sold to the Cunningham family in 1847. In 1835 Thomas Macquoid, then Sheriff of the New South Wales Supreme Court, bought Tuggeranong station then known as Waniassa property (sic).  The rural depression of 1840 hit hard and Macquoid committed suicide, fearing bankruptcy when he lost a civil suit brought by one William Henry Barnes. His son took over the estate and creditors allowed him to continue to operate it until it was sold by the Macquoid family in 1858 to the Cunningham family, owners of the neighbouring Lanyon property. They renamed Waniassa to Tuggranong.  The whole area was part of the Tuggeranong parish in the late nineteenth century. Tuggranong homestead was rebuilt by the Cunningham family in 1908.  In 1917 it was resumed by the Commonwealth Government for military purposes.  The Cunningham family remained at Lanyon until 1926.  Charles Bean, together with his staff, wrote the first two volumes of the twelve volume official history of Australia's involvement in World War I at the homestead from 1919 to 1925.  The Tuggeranong property was leased as a grazing property by the McCormack family from 1927 to 1976.

In 1973, the third of the new towns planned for Canberra was inaugurated at Tuggeranong on 21 February. Planning for the new town had begun in 1969. The first families moved into the suburb of Kambah in 1974. The fifth Canberra fire station opened at Kambah in 1979 to service the new developing satellite city.

Location and urban structure

The boundaries of the district are constrained by the Murrumbidgee River to the west, the border with the state of New South Wales to the south and east, and pastoral leases that mark the district's boundary to the north, including the remnants of the Tuggeranong Homestead, and to the north-west.

Lake Tuggeranong was created in 1987 by the construction of a dam on a tributary of the Murrumbidgee River. On the edge of the lake are a number of community facilities, including Lake Tuggeranong College, a school catering to years 11 and 12 (16–18 years old); a library, which is part of the ACT Library and Information Services, a community centre, and the Tuggeranong Arts Centre.

The Tuggeranong Town Centre is to the west of the lake. It includes a major shopping centre, known as South.Point; managed, developed and part owned by Vicinity Centres. It is surrounded by offices of the Australian and ACT governments, and a light industrial area.

A further heavy industrial area is located in the suburb of  that lies partly in the districts of both Tuggeranong and Jerrabomberra.

Climate
Tuggeranong has a temperate highland climate (Cfb) with dry, warm to hot summers and cool to cold winters. Frost is very common in the winter and snowfall occasionally occurs.

Representation
Tuggeranong is represented by:
 ACT Legislative Assembly: The Australian Capital Territory (ACT) was granted self-government by the Commonwealth Parliament in 1988 with the passage of the Australian Capital Territory (Self-Government) Act 1988. The first Assembly was elected in 1989.  There are currently 25 members of the Legislative Assembly (MLAs). Members are elected every four years by the people of the ACT to represent them and make decisions on their behalf.  The ACT Legislative Assembly  has five multi-member electorates: Yerrabi; Ginninderra; Kurrajong; Murrumbidgee and; Brindabella, each electing five members.
 Tuggeranong Community Council:  Tuggeranong Community Council  is recognised by the ACT Government as a community body representing the interests of the local residents, businesses and organisations within the Tuggeranong region of Canberra with the ACT Government. The Tuggeranong Community Council Is not a local government.

Demographics

Aboriginal and Torres Strait Islander people made up 3.0 per cent of the population, which was lower than the national average, but higher than the territory average. The median age of people in the Tuggeranong district was 38 years, similar to the national median. Children aged 0–14 years made up 19.2 per cent of the population and people aged 65 years and over made up 15.6 per cent of the population. Of people in the area aged 15 years and over, 49.1 per cent were married and 12.3 per cent were either divorced or separated.

Population growth in the Tuggeranong district between the 2001 census and the 2006 census was 0.85 per cent; in the five years to the 2011 census, the population decreased by 0.25 per cent; in the five years to the 2016 census, the population decreased by 2.0 per cent and in the five years to the 2021 census, the population increased by 5.1 per cent. When compared with total population growth of Australia for the same periods, being 5.79, 8.32, 8.81 and 8.64 per cent respectively, population growth in Tuggeranong district was significantly lower than the national average. The median weekly income for residents within the Tuggeranong district was significantly higher than the national average, and slightly lower than the territory average.

At the 2021 census, the proportion of residents in the Tuggeranong district who stated their ancestry as Australian or Anglo-Saxon exceeded 70 per cent of all residents (national average was 62.9 per cent). Meanwhile, at the census date, compared to the national average, households in the Tuggeranong district had a lower than average proportion (18.5 per cent) where a  language other than English was spoken (national average was 24.8 per cent); and a higher proportion (81.0 per cent) where English only was spoken at home (national average was 72.0 per cent).

List of suburbs

 Banks
 Bonython
 Calwell
 Chisholm
 Conder

 Fadden
 Gilmore
 Gordon
 Gowrie
 Greenway

 Hume
 Isabella Plains
 Kambah
 Macarthur

 Monash
 Oxley
 Richardson
 Theodore
 Wanniassa

A 1975 map of the proposed suburb names in Tuggeranong shows that many more suburbs were planned, and that the eventual layout of Tuggeranong is very different from what the planners were thinking. It was proposed that residential development would occur west of the Murrumbidgee River, a corridor that is subsequently free of urban development. Suburbs planned (but not built, or had their names changed) were: 

 Bass
 Batman
 Boyer
 Chippindall
 Denison
 Dobell

 Dunrossil
 Fawkner
 Flinders
 Franklin (now a suburb of the Gungahlin district)
 Freshford
 Heysen

 Hume (now an industrial suburb of the Tuggeranong and Jerrabomberra districts)
 Lindsay
 Maccallum
 Murdoch
 Niland
 Paterson
 Pedder

 Slessor
 Somers
 Stuart
 Throsby (now a suburb of the Gungahlin district)
 Wakefield
 Wardell
 Woodward

Places of note and interest
 South.Point Tuggeranong – large regional shopping centre
 Lanyon Homestead – a historic grazing property
 Tuggeranong Arts Centre – a community facility including workshops, gallery, dance studio and theatre.
 Tuggeranong Hill – a large mountain overlooking the valley.
 Tuggeranong Homestead – a historic homestead now operated as a café and function or event centre.
 Tuggeranong Town Centre – the town centre

References

External links

ACTMAPi – the ACT Government's interactive mapping service
Tuggeranong Homestead
Lanyon Homestead
Nolan Gallery
Google Maps Satellite Image of Tuggeranong

Districts of the Australian Capital Territory
1966 establishments in Australia